Otter Lake is the name of several lakes in the U.S. state of Michigan.

The lake is fed by the Otter River and it drains into the Sturgeon River.
The southern two thirds of the lake is within the Village of Otter Lake, which also straddles the boundary between the two counties. There is a public boat launch, dock, swim beach, and campground, as well as private homes on the shoreline. In the center of the lake are two prominent sandbars that reduce the water depth to much less than a meter in several locations. It is connected to Powderhorn lake on its northern end.

Other Otter Lakes in Michigan:
In Au Train Township, Alger County at  within Hiawatha National Forest
In Marcellus Township, Cass County at 
In Argentine Township, Genesee County at 
In Crystal Falls Township, Iron County at  within Copper Country State Forest, although not on state-owned land
In McMillan Township, Luce County at  within Lake Superior State Forest, part of a chain of lakes the drain into the Two Hearted River

See also
List of lakes in Michigan

References

Bodies of water of Genesee County, Michigan
Lakes of Michigan
Bodies of water of Lapeer County, Michigan